Wally Henry (born May 5, 1947, in Portage la Prairie, Manitoba, Canada) is an American curler and curling coach.

He worked as a national coach for United States Curling Association.

Awards
USA Curling Coach of the Year: 2007

Teams

Record as a coach of national teams

Personal life
His daughter Debbie McCormick is World and US curling champion, and his son Donnie Henry is a curler too.

Wally Henry started curling in 1955, when he was 8 years old.

References

External links

 Video: 

Living people
1947 births
People from Portage la Prairie
Sportspeople from Madison, Wisconsin
American male curlers
American curling champions
American curling coaches
Canadian emigrants to the United States